Shneider or Shneyder are surnames,   variants of Schneider as transliterated from the Russified spelling . It may refer to:
Natasha Shneider
Sid Shneider, a founder of Child World
Yurii Shneider, birth name of George Shevelov 

Mikhail Shneyder, president of the Nightingale College (as of 2020)